2nd SDFCS Awards 
December 18, 1997

Best Film: 
 L.A. Confidential 
The 2nd San Diego Film Critics Society Awards, given by the San Diego Film Critics Society on 18 December 1997, honored the best in film for 1997.

Winners
Best Actor:
Jack Nicholson - As Good as It Gets
Best Actress:
Pam Grier - Jackie Brown
Best Director:
James Cameron - Titanic
Best Film: 
L.A. Confidential
Best Screenplay - Adapted:
L.A. Confidential - Brian Helgeland and Curtis Hanson
Best Screenplay - Original:
As Good as It Gets - James L. Brooks
Best Supporting Actor:
Burt Reynolds - Boogie Nights
Best Supporting Actress:
Jurnee Smollett - Eve's Bayou
Special Award for Body of Work:
Samuel L. Jackson
  

1
1997 film awards
1997 in American cinema